Sim Viva (12 January 1903 – 10 August 1982) was a Belgian soprano singer and actress prominent in operetta and film in the 1920s and 1930s. She made several recordings on the Ultraphone, Pathé, and Odeon labels. .

Life and career
Sim Viva was born Simone Poncelet in Saint-Josse-ten-Noode, Belgium. By 1922 she was already appearing in Paris at Le Trianon where she sang in revivals Planquette's Le Paradis de Mahomet and Terrasse's Cartouche. She returned there the following year in Sylvie.

In operetta
Sim Viva's roles in operetta and musical theatre included:
 Trois jeunes filles nues by Raoul Moretti (1925) Théâtre des Bouffes-Parisiens, as Lilette (world premiere)
 J'aime! by Henri Christiné (1926) Théâtre des Bouffes-Parisiens, as Nicole de Malassis de la Panouille (world premiere)
 Mercenary Mary by Con Conrad and William B. Friedlander (1927) Théâtre des Bouffes-Parisiens, as Jenny (premiere of the French adaptation)
 Rosy by Raoul Moretti (1930) Théâtre des Folies-Wagram, as Noisette (world premiere)
Zou! by Josef Szulc, (1930) Théâtre des Folies-Wagram, as Magali (world premiere)
Nina-Rosa by Sigmund Romberg, (1931) Théâtre du Châtelet, as Nina Rosa (French premiere)
Brummell by Reynaldo Hahn (1931) Théâtre des Folies-Wagram, as Peggy (world premiere)
La Madone du promenoir by Henri Christiné (1933) Concert Mayol, as Sylvette (world premiere)
Miss Cocktail by Maurice Bertin (1934)  as Janine (world premiere)
Un p'tit bout d'femme by René Mercier (1936) Gaîté Lyrique, as Adrienne Baudry-Duclin (Paris premiere)
L' Auberge du chat coiffé by Josef Szulc (1936) Théâtre Pigalle as Toinette (world premiere)

Filmography
Sim Viva's film roles include: 
 (1931) as Mady Lagarouste
 (1933) as Solange
 (1935) as Cherry
 (1935) as Mimi
, based on Flotow's opera Martha (1936) as Lady Harriett ("Martha")
Prince d'une nuit (1936) as Simone Dastières

References

External links
Sound clip of Sim Viva and Louis Arnoult singing the duet "Je vous aimais sans le savoir" from Brummell (on Gallica)  

1903 births
1982 deaths
Belgian operatic sopranos
Belgian film actresses
20th-century Belgian women singers
20th-century Belgian singers